Willet Titus House is a historic residential building located at Roslyn in Nassau County, New York.  It was built about 1860 and is a 2-story Italianate-style frame house with an above-grade basement story at the west end.  It consists of a 2-story, rectangular main block with a three-bay side entrance facade and a recessed -story two-bay wing. It features porches at the front of the main block and wing.

It was listed on the National Register of Historic Places in 1986.

References

Roslyn, New York
Houses on the National Register of Historic Places in New York (state)
Italianate architecture in New York (state)
Houses completed in 1860
Houses in Nassau County, New York
National Register of Historic Places in North Hempstead (town), New York